The FC Bayern Munich Junior Team is the youth academy for German football club FC Bayern Munich. The Junior Team was created in 1902 and restructured in 1995. It has educated many players who have become regulars in the Bundesliga and Germany. The vision for the Junior Team is "to educate young players so that it will be possible for FCB to keep a global position in club football in the next millennium" and its mission is "to have the best youth development in club football.'

History
The Junior Team was created in 1902 and restructured in 1995.

In 2006 FC Bayern purchased land near the Allianz Arena with the purpose of building a new youth academy. In 2015 the project, estimated to cost €70 million, was started, after overcoming internal resistance. The main reasons for the project were that the existing facilities were too small and that the club, while very successful at senior level, lacked competitiveness with other German and European clubs at youth level. The new facility is scheduled to open in the 2017–18 season.

Overview

The vision for the Junior Team is "to educate young players so that it will be possible for FCB to keep a global position in club football in the next millennium" and its mission is "to have the best youth development in club football."

There are 165 players, 16 instructors and managers, 1 physiotherapist and 1 masseur. Rosters remain unchanged while the kids learn their trade whether it be for goalkeeper, defence, midfield or forward. They are trained for no more than 1 or 2 positions.

Bayern Munich Junior Team uses a 4–3–3 formation system from D Juniors and upwards. Players from overseas are offered accommodation in a youth apartment block with 13 single rooms inside the club grounds on Säbener Straße. The facility arrangement at different from many other high-profile clubs, in that both the first team and the youth teams train at the same location.

Bayern Munich has a residence building for players who are between 15 and 18 and live too far away from the training ground. Up to 14 youth team players can live there. They have an employee in the residence building where in the morning waking up and prepares a breakfast buffet and also takes care of small and large problems of youth players. There are up to eight part-time teachers are available to support the youth players to compensate for the educational gaps. The ground floor of the youth center is also the office of the junior team and a meeting room for the coaches.

Scouting

Bayern Munich has scouts all over the world, though most of the scouting happens within a few hours drive of Munich. Thomas Hitzlsperger, Christian Lell, Andreas Ottl, former captain Philipp Lahm and most recent graduates Holger Badstuber, Diego Contento and Thomas Müller are all from either Munich or within a 70 km radius of the city.

As part of the restructuring and to help find players for the Junior Team, Bayern Munich has developed a "Talent Day" where up to 500 boys are scouted. The Talent Days are done over Saturday and Sunday. The format used is 3 twenty-minute 5-a-side matches on reduced-sized football fields. The scouts are looking for how well the participants "cope with the ball" "particular skill", "excellent dribbling" and "good vision". An average of seven children will make it to the Bayern Munich Junior Team during Talent days. Talent Days has drawn "worldwide attention". The event has drawn participants from all over Germany along with participants from Austria, France, Italy, Egypt, Slovenia, Slovakia and Australia.

In 2003, Bayern Munich started partnering with other football clubs. The partner clubs are SpVgg Unterhaching, Ingolstadt 04, Kickers Offenbach and Ulm 1846, 1860 Rosenheim, SpVgg Landshut, TSV Milbertshofen and SC Fürstenfeldbruck. SpVgg Unterhaching, Ingolstadt 04, Kickers Offenbach and Ulm 1846 are the elite partners. 1860 Rosenheim and SpVgg Landshut are regional partners. TSV Milbertshofen and SC Fürstenfeldbruck are local partners. Udo Bassemir is responsible for club partnerships. Players they are interested in are not transferred immediately. They allow the player to train at their own club and at Bayern Munich's training fields and the transfer happens at the "right time".

Reserve team

The penultimate stage for youngsters at Bayern is Bayern Munich II, which currently plays in the Regionalliga Bayern, the fourth tier of German football.

Current youth squads

Under-19

Under-17

Out on loan

Technical staff

The director of the youth setup at Bayern Munich is Jochen Sauer. The following staff are in charge of the various age groups:

Noted graduates
The following players played either first team football for Bayern or in the Bundesliga for another club:

Note: So far, that means the Bayern München Junior Academy has produced;

FIFA World Cup
 2 World Cup winning captains
 11 World Cup winners
UEFA European Championships
5 European Championship winners
UEFA Champions League
 13 European Cup/ Champions League winners
UEFA Europa League
 5 UEFA Cup/Europa League winners

Honours

Youth
 Under 19 Bundesliga
Winners: 2001, 2002, 2004
 Runners-up: 1998, 2006, 2007, 2012, 2017
 Under 17 Bundesliga
Winners: 1989, 1997, 2001, 2007, 2017
 Runners-up: 2000, 2009, 2018
 South/Southwest German Under 19 championship
Winners: 2004, 2007, 2012, 2013, 2017
 South/Southwest German Under 17 championship
Winners: 2009, 2017, 2018, 2019
 Southern German Under 19 championship
Winners: 1950, 1954
 Southern German Under 15 championship
Winners: 1982, 1985, 1987, 1990, 1991
 Bavarian Under 19 championship
Winners: 1950, 1954, 1966, 1972, 1973, 1981, 1985, 1987, 1991, 1992, 1994, 1995, 1996
Runners-up: 1946, 1960, 1964, 1980, 1999‡
 Bavarian Under 17 championship
Winners: 1976, 1978, 1983, 1985, 1986, 1988, 1989, 1993, 1994, 1997, 1998, 2000, 2010‡, 2014‡
Runners-up: 1982, 1987, 1990, 1992, 1996, 2012‡, 2015‡
 Bavarian Under 15 championship
Winners: 1975, 1978, 1982, 1985, 1987, 1990, 1991, 1994, 1995, 2007, 2009
Runners-up: 1976, 1977, 1988, 1992, 2008
 ‡ Reserve team

 Recent seasons 
The recent season-by-season performance of the club's under 19 and under 17 sides since 2003–04:

Under-19

Under-17

Heads of the Junior team

German championship winning teams
Bayern Munich has won the German under 19 championship three times and the under 17 championship five times. Here are the championship winning teams with goals in the final in brackets:

Under-19

Under-17

References

External links
Bayern Munich U19 Team website
 The Bayern Munich academy way – These Football Times'' (2015)

Junior Team
Football academies in Germany
Football in Munich
UEFA Youth League teams